In aboriginal mythology (specifically: Kunwinjku), Wurugag and Waramurungundi are the first man and woman, respectively.  Waramurungundi is said to have given birth to all living things and taught language to the people of Australia.

References

Legendary Australian people
Legendary progenitors
Mythological first humans